Andrew Ewing Kyle (October 29, 1889 – September 6, 1971) was a Canadian Major League Baseball outfielder and National Hockey Association defenseman. He was the first person to play both baseball and ice hockey professionally.

Baseball
In baseball, Kyle turned professional with the Class A Toronto Maple Leafs in 1910. He didn't get much playing time and was sent to the Elgin Kittens of the Northern Association in May and then, when that league folded, to the Lawrence Colts of the New England League in July. Kyle rejoined the Leafs in September. In 1911, he played for Troy in the New York State League but was released in May. Kyle then joined the London Tecumsehs in the Canadian League. The following season, he played for the Columbus Senators of the American Association and for the Akron Rubbermen of the Central League.

Kyle was purchased by the Cincinnati Reds, playing in his first major league game on September 7, 1912, and his last on October 6, 1912. He appeared in nine games and hit .333 (7-for-21) with four runs batted in and three runs scored. He drew four walks which pushed his on-base percentage up to .440. In seven outfield appearances he handled 16 chances without an error. The 22-year-old stood 5'8" and weighed 160 lbs.

After his brief major league stint, Kyle played for the New Orleans Pelicans of the Southern Association in 1913, where his batting average fell to .194. He continued to play on and off in the minors until 1921, spending his last three seasons with the Kitchener Beavers of the Michigan-Ontario League.

Hockey

As an ice hockey player, Kyle played junior with the Eurekas in Toronto in the 1908–09 season. He was team captain and led the Eurekas to the Ontario Hockey Association finals, where they lost to Stratford. In September 1909, he announced that he was giving up hockey to become a full-time silver prospector in Northern Ontario, but returned after seven weeks. He was captain of the Parkdale Canoe Club senior team for the 1909–10 season until leaving to join the Maple Leafs' baseball training camp.

Kyle played with the professional team in Port Hope, Ontario, for the 1910–11 season and worked as a referee following an injury. He continued as a referee in 1912. He attended the inaugural training camp of the Toronto Blueshirts in 1912, but left the team before the season began to play for Moncton Victorias of the MaPHL. He played there for two seasons. He was captain of the team in Glace Bay, Nova Scotia, early in the 1914–15 season. Kyle rejoined the Blueshirts in the National Hockey Association for the 1916–17 season.

Kyle died in his hometown of Toronto at the age of 81, and he is buried at Park Lawn Cemetery.

Later Years
Kyle played golf in the 1930s but ended his sporting career by the 1940s and became an executive with the Givens School Old Boys' Association.

References

External links

1889 births
1971 deaths
Baseball players from Toronto
Bloomington Bloomers players
Canadian expatriate baseball players in the United States
Canadian ice hockey defencemen
Cincinnati Reds players
Dayton Veterans players
Ice hockey people from Ontario
Kitchener Beavers players
Lawrence Colts players
London Cockneys players
Major League Baseball outfielders
Major League Baseball players from Canada
New Orleans Pelicans (baseball) players
Terre Haute Terre-iers players
Toronto Blueshirts players
Toronto Maple Leafs (International League) players
Toronto Shamrocks players
Wheeling Stogies players